Robert Desroches (14 July 1929 – 15 June 2021) was a Canadian actor.

Filmography

Television 
 (1958)
 (1958–1959)
 (1959–1962)
 (1960–1964)
 (1963)
 (1965)
Moi et l'autre (1966)
 (1967–1968)
 (1970)
 (1976–1977)
 (1977–1978)
 (1977–1978)
 (1977)
Terre humaine (1978–1984)
Duplessis (1978)
 (1978)
Les Brillant (1979–1982)
 (1980)
 (1980–1986)
 (1991–1993)
 (1992)
Scoop (1992)
Virginie (1996–1997)

Cinema 
The Men (1971)
There's Always a Way to Find a Way (1973)
The Apprenticeship of Duddy Kravitz (1974)
J.A. Martin Photographer (1977)
Scandale (1982)

References

External links 

1929 births
2021 deaths
Canadian male television actors
Canadian male film actors
French Quebecers
20th-century Canadian male actors
Male actors from Montreal
Place of death missing